Giardina Galloti is a village of approximately 1200 inhabitants in the Sicilian province of Agrigento. It is part of the municipality of Agrigento.

Geography of Sicily
Province of Agrigento